Lobocneme icterica is a species of praying mantis in the family Mantidae found in South America.

References

Mantidae
Insects described in 1894